Etz Chaim (Hebrew: עץ חיים, "Tree of Life") is a literary work that deals with the Kabbalah, the book was written in 1573. The book of Etz Chaim is a summary of the teachings of the Rabbi Isaac Luria, the Arizal (1534-1572). The Arizal was a rabbi and a kabbalist who created a new tendency in the study of the Kabbalah.

The book was published thanks to the student and disciple of the Ari, the Rabbi Chaim Vital, who wrote the teachings of his master, during the lessons that the Arizal taught, to his disciples that were part of his study group of Kabbalah, in the city of Safed, in Ottoman Palestine. The Rabbi Chaim Vital compiled the teachings of the Ari, in a book that deals with the Lurianic Kabbalah. 

The book talks about the divine order and the existence of the things. The work deals with revelation and the perception of the reality by the man of our time. The first fragment of the book makes reference to the tree of life, which is where the book gets its name from: "You know, before the beginning of the Creation there was only the highest and fullest light. The description of the creation process starts from that point, especially".

The book marks the beginning of the Lurianic Kabbalah, but it was Rabbi Chaim Vital who revealed the content of the work to the World. Before the Arizal, the Kabbalists revealed in their books, the development of reality from its origin to our world (from the understandable light). The Arizal HaKadosh discovered a method to understand the reality better.

References 

Kabbalah texts
1573 books